The 1976 Oregon State Beavers football team represented Oregon State University in the Pacific-8 Conference (Pac-8) during the 1976 NCAA Division I football season. In their first season under head coach Craig Fertig, the Beavers compiled a 2–10 record (1–6 in Pac-8, last), and were outscored 325 to 179. The team played its five home games on campus at Parker Stadium in Corvallis.

Fertig, age 34, was previously a USC assistant and former Trojan quarterback (1962–64) under John McKay; he succeeded Dee Andros in December 1975 with a three-year contract at $26,000 per year.

Schedule

Roster

References

External links
 Game program: Oregon State at Washington State – November 6, 1976

Oregon State
Oregon State Beavers football seasons
Oregon State Beavers football